The following is a list of notable people who were born in Berlin, Germany.

Politicians and Statesmen

 Friedrich Ancillon (1767–1837), Prussian historian and statesman.
 Adolf Heinrich von Arnim-Boitzenburg (1803–1868), statesman and politician 
 Eduard Bernstein (1850–1932), politician (SPD), member of the Reichstag
 Berthold von Bernstorff (1842–1917), politician and owner of Schiermonnikoog.
 Anna of Brandenburg (1487–1514), noblewoman and mother of Christian III (King of Denmark)
 Rudy Boschwitz (born 1930), U.S. Senator from Minnesota and former U.S. Ambassador to the United Nations Commission on Human Rights, born to a Jewish family in Berlin.
 Rainer Brüderle (born 1945), politician (FDP)
 Sawsan Chebli (born 1978), politician (SPD)
 Eberhard Diepgen (born 1941), politician (CDU), Governing Mayor of Berlin
 Kurt Eisner (1867–1919), politician (SPD, USPD)
 Frederick the Great (1712–1786), King of Prussia from 1740 until 1786.
 Frederick William (1620–1688), Elector of Brandenburg and Duke of Prussia from 1640 until 1688.
 Frederick William I (1688–1740), King in Prussia and Elector of Brandenburg from 1713 until 1740.
 Frederick William II (1744–1797), King of Prussia from 1786 until 1797.
 Stefan Gelbhaar (born 1976), politician (Bündnis 90/Die Grünen)
 Ernst Ludwig von Gerlach (1795–1877), judge, politician and journalist
 George V of Hanover (1819—1878), King of Hanover from 1851 until 1866.
 Gregor Gysi (born 1948), politician (The Left)
 Klaus Gysi (1912–1999), Minister of Culture and state secretary for church affairs of GDR
 Prince Friedrich Karl of Prussia (1828–1885), brother of future German emperor William I.
 Reinhard Klimmt (born 1942), politician (SPD), Prime Minister of Saarland 
 Hans Luther (1879–1962), Chancellor in the Weimar Republic
 David McAllister (born 1971), politician (CDU), Prime Minister of Niedersachsen
 Erich Mielke (1907–2000), head of the Stasi
 Petra Pau (born 1963), politician (The Left)
 Hugo Preuss (1860–1925), lawyer and "father of the Weimar Constitution"
 Jesko von Puttkamer (1855–1917), colonial military chief, and nine times governor of Cameroon
 Walther Rathenau (1867–1922), industrialist, politician (DDP) and Foreign Minister of the Weimar Republic
 Baldur von Schirach (1907–1974), leader of the Hitlerjugend 1931-1940, Reich governor in Vienna
 Rupert Scholz (born 1937), politician (CDU)
 Paul Singer (1844–1911), SPD co-founder, whose chairman and Reichstag, producer
 Willi Stoph (1914–1999), politician (SED), Chairman of the State Council 
 Gustav Stresemann (1878–1929), politician (DVP), chancellor and foreign minister of the Weimar Republic, Nobel Peace Prize laureate
 Otto Wels (1873–1939), politician (SPD)
 William I, German Emperor (1797–1888), German Emperor.
 Wilhelm II, German Emperor (1859–1941), German Emperor.
 Wilhelmine of Prussia (1709–1758), Margravine of Brandenburg-Bayreuth.
 Klaus Wowereit (born 1953), politician (SPD), Governing Mayor of Berlin from 2001 to 2014

Entrepreneurs 

 Ellen Allien, musician, DJ, founder of music label BPitch Control
 Heinz Berggruen (1914–2007), art dealer
 Ernst Dümmler (1830–1902), bookseller and historian.
 Alexander Duncker (1813–1897), publisher and bookseller
 Friedrich Karl Flick (1927–2006), industrialist and billionaire
 Albert Göring (1895–1966), engineer and business manager
 Klaus and Eva Herlitz (born 1947 and 1952 respectively), business people and the initiators of the Buddy Bears
 Günter Herlitz (1913-2010), business people
 Bernhard Koehler (1849-1927), industrialist and art collector
 Gustav Langenscheidt (1832–1895), language teacher, book publisher, and the founder of Langenscheidt Publishing Group
 Ernst Litfaß (1816–1874), publisher, inventor of the Litfaßsäule 
 Joseph Mendelssohn (1770–1848), banker.
 Franz Oppenheim (1852-1929), industrialist and chemist
 Harald Quandt (1921–1967), industrialist 
 Hasso Plattner (born 1944), co-founder of SAP SE software company
 Emil Rathenau (1838–1915), industrialist and founder of the AEG
 Wolf Jobst Siedler (1926–2013), publisher and publicist
 Arnold von Siemens (1853-1918), entrepreneur and industrialist
 Carl Friedrich von Siemens (1872–1941), industrialist
 Georg Wilhelm von Siemens (1855-1919), industrialist
 Georg Solmssen (1869-1957), German banker
 Joachim Heinrich Wilhelm Wagener (1782-1861), German banker and patron of the arts

Military officers

 Hans-Rudolf Boehmer (born 1938), Vice Admiral A.D. the German Navy, inspector of the navy (1995–1998)
 Karl von Bülow (1846–1921), Prussian field marshal
 Heinz Brandt (1907–1944), General Staff officer
 Adolf von Brauchitsch (1876-1935),  German army officer with the rank of major general
 Walther von Brauchitsch (1881-1948), German field marshal
 Leo von Caprivi (1831–1899), Vice Admiral of the Imperial German Navy, politicians, Chancellor as a successor Bismarck.
 Karl Dönitz (1891–1980), naval officer and commander of the German Navy in WWII
 Maximilian von Edelsheim (1897-1994), general
 Max von Fabeck (1854–1916), Prussian general
 Maximilian Vogel von Falckenstein (1839–1917), Prussian general
 Friedrich Wilhelm Quirin von Forcade de Biaix (1699–1765), Prussian general
 Georg Freiherr von Gayl (1850–1927), Prussian general
 Ludwig Friedrich Leopold von Gerlach (1790–1861), Prussian general
 Karl von Grolman (1777–1843), Prussian general.
 Friedrich Wilhelm von Grumbkow (1678–1739), Prussian field marshal
 Wilhelm von Hahnke (1833–1912), Prussian field marshal
 Henning von Holtzendorff (1853–1919), German admiral
 Ludwig Karl von Kalckstein (1725–1800), Prussian field marshal
 Otto von Knobelsdorff (1886-1966), German general
 Christian Nicolaus von Linger (1669–1755), Prussian general
 Ludwig Adolf Wilhelm von Lützow (1782–1834), Prussian lieutenant general 
 Erich von Manstein (1887–1973), German Field Marshal
 Alexander von Monts (1832–1888), Prussian and German Imperial Navy officer
 Friedrich Graf Kleist von Nollendorf (1762–1823), Prussian field marshal
 Jürgen Oesten (1913–2010), German Korvettenkapitän in the Kriegsmarine 
 Hermann von Oppeln-Bronikowski (1899–1966), German general
 Alexander August Wilhelm von Pape (1813–1895), Prussian field marshal
 Augustus Ferdinand of Prussia (1730–1813), Prussian general
 Adalbert of Prussia (1811–1873), Prussian admiral
 Albert of Prussia (1837–1906), Prussian general field marshal
 Friedrich Karl of Prussia (1828-1873), Prussian field marshal
 Henry of Prussia (1726–1802), 13 child king Frederick William. I in Prussia, the Prussian commander army
 Albert von Rauch (1829–1901), Prussian general
 Fedor von Rauch (1822-1892), cavalry officer in the Prussian Army
 Friedrich von Rauch (1855–1935), Prussian general
 Gustav Waldemar von Rauch (1819–1890), Prussian general
 Nikolaus von Rauch (1851–1904), Prussian oberst
 Klaus Reinhardt (born 1941), German general
 Manfred von Richthofen (1892–1918), German fighter pilot
 August Otto Rühle von Lilienstern (1780–1848), Prussian lieutenant general
 Sigismund von Schlichting (1829–1909), Prussian general
 Alfred von Schlieffen (1833–1913), Field Marshal
 Samuel von Schmettau (1682–1751), Prussian field marshal
 Rudolf Schmidt (1886–1957), German general
 Friedrich von Sohr (1775–1845), Prussian colonel
 Christoph Ludwig von Stille (1696–1752), Prussian general
 Günther Tamaschke (1896–1959), Nazi SS concentration camp commandant
 Carl Friedrich Heinrich, Graf von Wylich und Lottum (1767–1841), Prussian general

Scientists

 Otto Wilhelm Hermann von Abich (1806–1886), mineralogist and geologist.
 Franz Karl Achard (1753–1821), chemist, geoscientist, physicist and biologist.
 Michael Albeck (born 1934), Israeli chemist; President of Bar-Ilan University
 Friedrich Eduard Beneke (1798 – ca.1854), psychologist and philosopher.
 Emil du Bois-Reymond (1818–1896), physiologist and public intellectual.
 Max Delbrück (1906–1981), biophysicist
 Paul Erman (1764–1851), a Huguenot physicist.
 Hermann von Helmholtz (1821–1894), philosopher, physiologist and physicist.
 Ingrid van Houten-Groeneveld (1921–2015), Dutch astronomer
 Alexander von Humboldt (1769–1859), geographer, naturalist, explorer, and influential proponent of Romantic philosophy and science.
 Julius Klaproth (1783–1835), orientalist, explorer, historian and ethnographer. 
 Edmund Landau (1877–1938), mathematician 
 Paul Langerhans (1847–1888), pathologist, physiologist, and biologist
 Johann Nathanael Lieberkühn (1711-1756), physician
 Andreas Sigismund Marggraf (1709–1782), chemist.
 Bernhard Hermann Neumann (1909–2002), mathematician
 Peter Simon Pallas (1741-1811),  naturalist, botanist and zoologist. 
 Wolf-Dieter Schneider (born 1942), German metallurgist and university professor
 Alfred Wegener (1880–1930), polar researcher, geophysicist and meteorologist
 Adolf Windaus (1876–1959), chemist who won a Nobel Prize in Chemistry in 1928
 Carl Gustav Witt (1866–1946), astronomer and discover of two asteroids 
 Konrad Zuse (1910–1995), civil engineer, inventor and computer pioneer

Judges and Lawyers
 Heinz Drossel (1916–2008), judge, was honored as Righteous Among the Nations
 Eduard Gans (1797–1839), jurist.
 Rudolf von Gneist (1816–1895), jurist and politician.
 Wilhelm Heinrich von Grolman (1781–1856), lawyer, Berlin Court of Appeal president (the "righteous judge")
 Fritz Oppenheimer (1898–1968), lawyer
 Jutta Limbach (1934–2016), President of the Federal Constitutional Court of Germany from 1994 to 2002, as the first woman in this office
 Hans-Jürgen Papier (born 1943), President of the Federal Constitutional Court s 2002–2010

Theologians 
 Kurt Aland (1915–1994), theologian
 Albrecht of Brandenburg (1490–1545), archbishop of Magdeburg and Elector of Mainz, Lord Chancellor of  Holy Roman Empire of the German Nation.
 Otto Dibelius (1880–1967), leading member of the Confessing Church, bishop of Berlin, Chairman of the Council of Evangelical Church, president of Ecumenical Council
 Regina Jonas (1902–1944), first woman in history to be ordained as a rabbi

Authors, Historians, Journalists, Scholars, Philosophers  

 Achim von Arnim (1781–1831), author, poet and novelist.
 Gisela von Arnim (1827–1889), author
 Bernd-Rainer Barth (born 1957), historian and publicist
 Alexander Gottlieb Baumgarten (1714–1762), philosopher.
 Heinrich Becker (1770–1822), actor.
 Walter Benjamin (1892–1940), philosopher
 Ludwig Borchardt (1863–1938), Egyptologist
 Adolf Brand (1874-1945), writer
 Gottfried Gabriel Bredow (1773–1814), historian.
 Heinrich Brugsch (1827–1894), Egyptologist.
 Friedrich von Canitz (1654-1699), poet and diplomat. 
 Hoimar von Ditfurth (1921–1989), physician, writer and journalist
 Georg Ebers (1837–1898), Egyptologist.
 Ernst Ehrlich (1921–2007), German-Swiss Judaic scholar and historian
 Joachim Fest (1926–2006), historian, journalist and author
 Paul Friedlander (1882–1968), philologist and writer
 Kurt Großmann (1897-1972, journalist
 Hans Gustav Güterbock (1908–2000), Hittitologist
 Hans von Hentig (1887–1974), criminologist
 Kurt Hiller (1885-1972), writer, journalist and essayist
 Gerald Holton (born 1922), science historian and physicist
 Wilhelm von Humboldt (1767-1835), philosopher, linguist, government functionary, diplomat, and founder of the Humboldt University of Berlin.
 Maybrit Illner (born 1965), journalist
 Robert Jungk (1913–1994), writer, journalist and futurist
 Manuela Kay (born 1964), journalist and writer
 Klemens von Klemperer (1916–2012), historian
 Luise Kraushaar (1905–1989), historian
 Bernhard von Kugler (1837–1898), historian
 Günther von Lojewski (1935–2023), journalist
 Wolf von Lojewski (born 1937), journalist
 Herbert Marcuse (1898–1979), German-American philosopher, political scientist and sociologist
 Erich Maschke (1900–1982), historian and professor of history
 Hildegard Maria Nickel (born 1948), sociologist specializing in gender studies
 Franz Oppenheimer (1864–1943), sociologist and economist
 Iris Radisch (born 1959), journalist
 Peter Rüchel (1937–2019), music journalist
 Hajo Seppelt (born 1963), journalist
 Georg Simmel (1858–1918), sociologist, philosopher
 Gabor Steingart (born 1962), journalist and author
 Ludwig Tieck (1773–1853), poet, translator, editor, novelist.
 Kurt Tucholsky (1890-1935), journalist and writer
 Rahel Varnhagen (1771–1833), writer and prominent salon host.
 Theodor Wolff (1868-1943), journalist and writer

Actors, Architects, Artists, Comedians, Directors and Singers 

 Ken Adam (1921–2016) set designer
 Nadja Auermann (born 1971), supermodel
 Die Ärzte band members, Farin Urlaub and Bela B
 Peer Augustinski (1940–2014), actor
 Hugo Egon Balder (born 1950), actor and comedian
 Mario Barth (born 1972), comedian
 Karl Becker (1820-1900), painter
 Reinhold Begas (1831–1911), sculptor.
 Michael Ballhaus (1935–2017), cinematographer
 Tim Bendzko (born 1985), singer-songwriter
 Dagmar Berghoff (born 1943), actress, radio and television presenter
 Folker Bohnet (1937–2020), actor, theatre director and playwright
 Horst Buchholz (1933–2003), actor
 Karl August Devrient (1797–1872), stage actor. 
 Ludwig Devrient (1784–1832), actor. 
 Marlene Dietrich (1901–1992), singer and actress
 Christoph von Dohnányi (born 1929), conductor
 Angelica Domröse (born 1941), actress
 Caroline Fischer (born 1984), pianist
 Dietrich Fischer-Dieskau (1925–2012)
 Klaus Doldinger (born 1936), saxophonist
 Elton (born 1971), comedian and television presenter
 Alexander Fehling (born 1981), actor
 Hansjörg Felmy (1931–2007), actor
 Julia Franck (born 1970), writer
 Naomi Frankel (1918–2009), novelist
 Peter Frankenfeld (1913–1979), comedian, radio and television personality
 Liv Lisa Fries (born 1990), actress
 Claus Theo Gärtner (born 1943), actor
 Bonaventura Genelli (1798–1868), painter.
 Götz George (1938–2016), actor
 Kurt Gerron (1897-1944), actor
 Valeska Gert (1892–1978), dancer and cabaret artist
 Walter Gronostay (1906-1937), composer
 Walter Gropius (1883–1961), architect
 Georg Grosz (1893–1959), painter
 Nina Hagen (born 1955), singer
 Karoline Herfurth (born 1984), actress
 Judith Hermann (born 1970), writer
 Paul Heyse (1830–1914), writer, novelist, dramatist and poet.
 Martina Hill (born 1974), actress
 Margot Hielscher (1919–2017), actress
 Alfred Hirschmeier (1931-1996), film production designer
 Marta Husemann (1913-1960), actress, communist and resistance fighter
 Harald Juhnke (1929–2005) actor, singer, comedian and entertainer
 Roland Kaiser (born 1952), singer
 Nastassja Kinski (born 1961), actress
 Johanna von Koczian (born 1933), actress
 Wolfgang Kohlhaase (born 1931), screenwriter and film director
 Hildegard Knef (1925–2002) singer and actress
 Asuman Krause (born 1976) German-Turkish singer, model and TV personality
 Hardy Krüger (born 1928), actor
 Fritz Kühn (1910-1967), visual artist
 Peer Kusmagk (born 1975), actor
 Paul Landers (born 1964), musician of band Rammstein
 Maria Landrock (1923-1992), actress
 Kevyn Lettau (born 1959), singer jazz
 Max Liebermann (1847–1935), painter.
 Paul Lincke (1866–1946), composer and theatre conductor
 Christian Lorenz (born 1966), musician of band Rammstein
 Albert Lortzing (1801–1851), composer, librettist, actor and singer.
 Ernst Lubitsch (1892–1947), film director, producer, writer, and actor
 Florian Lukas (born 1973), actor
 Markus Majowski (born 1964), actor and comedian
 Giacomo Meyerbeer (1791–1864), an opera composer.
 Inge Meysel (1910–2004), actress
 Helmut Newton (born Helmut Neustädter) (1920–2004), photographer
 Désirée Nick (born 1956), actress and writer
 Erik Ode (1910-1983), actor and film director
 Gerd Oswald (1919-1989), film director
 Kerstin Ott (born 1982), singer
 Johann Christoph Pepusch (1667–1752), composer, lived in England. 
 Oliver Petszokat (born 1978), singer
 Günter Pfitzmann (1924–2003), actor
 Hans Poelzig (1864–1936), architect
 André Previn (1929–2019), pianist, conductor and composer
 Jürgen Prochnow (born 1941), actor
 Rammstein band members, Paul Landers, bassist Oliver Riedel, drummer and keyboardist Christian Lorenz
 Ivan Rebroff (1931-2008), singer
 Leni Riefenstahl (1902–2003), photographer, film director, producer, screenwriter and editor
 Marianne Rosenberg (born 1955), singer
 Hans Rosenthal (1925–1987), radio editor, director, and radio and television host
 Erna Sack (1898-1972), soprano singer
 Tom Schilling (born 1982), actor
 Wilhelm Schirmer (1802–1866), painter.
 Cornelia Schleime (born 1953), painter,  performer, filmmaker and author
 Jörn Schlönvoigt (born 1986), actor and singer
 Christoph Schneider (born 1966), musician of Band Rammstein
 Louis Schneider (1805–1878), actor and author.
 Klaus Schulze (born 1947), electronic music pioneer, composer and musician
 Tomer Sisley (born 1974), Israeli humorist, actor, screenwriter, comedian, and film director
 Max Skladanowsky (1863-1939), early filmmaker and co-inventor of Bioscop
 Elke Sommer (born 1940), actor
 Detlef Soost (born 1970), dancer, choreograph and tv-presenter
 Ingrid Steeger (born 1947), actress and comedian
 Carl Steffeck (1818-1890), painter
 Hermann Struck (1876-1944), painter
 Katrin Lea Tag (born 1972), scenic designer and costume designer
 Katharina Thalbach (born 1954), actress
 Christian Thielemann (born 1959),conductor
 Sophia Thomalla (born 1989), actress
 Nora Tschirner (born 1981), actress
 Kurt Tucholsky, (1890–1935), writer
 Michael Verhoeven (born 1938), actor
 Otto Wallburg (1889-1944), actor
 Volker Wangenheim (1928–2014), conductor, composer and academic teacher
 Dana Wynter (1931-2011), actress
 Jing Xiang (born 1993), actress
 Rolf Zacher (1941–2018), actor

Sportspeople

 Rudi Ball (1911–1975), Olympic and Hall of Fame ice hockey player
 Muhamed Bešić (born 1992), professional footballer who plays for the Bosnia and Herzegovina national football team.
 Jérôme Boateng (born 1988), football player and 2014 FIFA World Cup winner
 Kevin-Prince Boateng (born 1987), football player
 Guido Buchwald (born 1961), footballer
Karim Darwiche (born 1998), Lebanese international footballer
 Sven Felski (born 1974), ice hockey coach
 Gottfried Fuchs (1889–1972), German-Canadian Olympic soccer player
 Thomas Häßler (born 1966), footballer and 1990 FIFA World Cup winner
 Robert Harting (born 1984), discus thrower
 Heinz Henschel (1920–2006), German Ice Hockey Hall of Fame, and IIHF Hall of Fame inductee
 Achim Hill (1935-2015), German rower
 Robert Huth (born 1984), footballer
 Gustav Jaenecke (born 1908), Olympic ice hockey player
 Patrick Jahn (born 1983), German footballer
 Carsten Keller (born 1939),  field hockey player and gold medalist at the 1972 Summer Olympics, father of Andreas Keller, Natascha Keller and Florian Keller 
 Max Kepler (born 1993), is a baseball player for the Minnesota Twins of the MLB
 Henry Laskau (born 1916), track and field athlete
 Pierre Littbarski (born 1960), footballer
 Laura Ludwig (born 1986), beach volleyballer
 Ingeborg Mello (born 1919), track and field athlete
Hassan Oumari (born 1986), footballer
Joan Oumari (born 1988), footballer
 Claudia Pechstein (born 1972), speed skater
 Ellen Preis (Ellen Müller-Preis) (1912–2007), German-born Austrian Olympic champion foil fencer
 Daniel Prenn (1904–1991), Russian-born German, Polish, and British world-top-ten tennis player
 Otto Scheff (born 1886), Olympic swimmer
 Gustav Scholz (1930–2000), boxer
 Jochen Schümann (born 1959), sailor and Olympic champion
 Amar Sejdić (born 1996), footballer for Atlanta United
 Hagen Stamm (born 1960), water polo player
 Ulf Timmermann (born 1962), shot putter
 Franziska van Almsick (born 1978), swimmer and sport journalist
 Katarina Witt (born 1965), figure skater
 Christian Ziege (born 1972), footballer

Others

 Erna Barschak (1888-1958), teacher and psychologist
 Bärbel Bohley (1945-2010), opposition figure and artist
 Harald Braem (born 1944), writer, designer and professor
 Gabriele von Bülow (1802–1887), noblewoman
 Margot Dreschel (1908–1945), Nazi concentration camp guard executed for war crimes
 Käthe Niederkirchner (1909-1944), communist and resistance fighter
 Horst Fischer (1912–1966), SS concentration camp doctor executed for war crimes
 Heinz Kapelle (1913-1941), communist and resistance fighter
 Elisabeth Lupka (1902–1949), Nazi concentration camp guard executed for war crimes
 Rosalie von Rauch (1829-1879), German noblewoman
 Karl-Eduard von Schnitzler (1918-2001), communist propagandist

See also

Culture of Berlin
Music in Berlin
Sport in Berlin

References

 
Berlin